Herbert Morris Cohen (born June 7, 1940) is an American Olympic foil fencer.

Early and personal life
Cohen is Jewish, was born in New York City, grew up in Brooklyn and has lived in Holmdel, New Jersey. His elder brother was the Olympic fencer Abe Cohen, who competed for the United States in the 1956 Summer Olympics.

Fencing career
Cohen started fencing at the age of 15, and fenced at Abraham Lincoln High School in Brooklyn, New York. He was captain of the fencing team, which included his best friend, future singer Neil Diamond.

He then fenced at New York University (Class of 1962), alongside, among others, Neil Diamond and future Olympian Eugene Glazer. In 1961, he went undefeated during the year and won both the NCAA foil championship and the NCAA saber championship. Fencing for NYU in 1962 he won his second straight NCAA Championship in foil, while being named national Fencer of the Year. He was a three-time All-American.

He fenced for the Fencers Club in New York. Cohen won a gold medal in team foil and a bronze medal in individual foil at the 1963 Pan American Games. In 1964, Cohen won the US National Fencing Championship in foil, while Albie Axelrod took the silver medal and Eugene Glazer took the bronze medal.

Cohen competed in both the individual and team foil events at the 1964 Summer Olympics in Tokyo at the age of 24, and the 1968 Summer Olympics in Mexico at the age of 28.

As to his philosophy of fencing, Cohen said: "I always fought as if my life depended on it."

He was the head fencing coach at NYU from 1975 to 1977, and led the team to the 1976 NCAA Championship. In 1977 he coached the fencing team at Stuyvesant High School in Manhattan, New York. In 2016, he coached Teaneck High School. In 1995, Cohen was inducted into the NYU Hall of Fame.

References

External links
 

1940 births
Living people
American male foil fencers
Jewish male foil fencers
Jewish American sportspeople
Olympic fencers of the United States
Fencers at the 1964 Summer Olympics
Fencers at the 1968 Summer Olympics
Pan American Games medalists in fencing
Pan American Games gold medalists for the United States
Pan American Games bronze medalists for the United States
Sportspeople from Brooklyn
People from Holmdel Township, New Jersey
NYU Violets fencers
Abraham Lincoln High School (Brooklyn) alumni
NYU Violets fencing coaches
Stuyvesant High School
Fencers at the 1963 Pan American Games
Medalists at the 1963 Pan American Games
21st-century American Jews